Fort Darnet, is a nineteenth-century military installation on the River Medway in Kent, England, that formed part of the defences of Chatham Naval Dockyard.

Building started on the island in 1870 and then finished in 1872. Originally designed for two tiers of guns mounted in a circle, with a boom strung between them, there were many problems with subsidence, and after extensive cost overruns the forts were completed in 1872 with one tier, and 11 guns : a mixture of 8 9-inch and 3 7-inch rifled muzzle-loaders.  The boom was not implemented though there were plans to mine the channel if thought needed. It was originally designed for a garrison of up to 100 men.

The fort was used for gunnery practice until one of the guns cracked in its casemate, as reported in ‘The Chatham Observer’ on 25 January 1879.

The forts were never used in anger, and were decommissioned before the First World War. In the Second World War the fort was used as an observation post, with platforms and pillboxes built on top. The fort is still in fair condition, however the magazine level is flooded. The island can be freely visited by boat, though the landing is muddy.

Up to the 1980s, the island was used for picnicking and other leisure pursuits.

It is scheduled under the Ancient Monuments and Archaeological Areas Act 1979.

References

Bibliography
Crowdy, R, Medway's Island Forts, (1979)
Gulvin, K R, The Medway Forts, (1976), 18-19
Smith, V T C, Strategic Study of Kents Defences - Fort Darnet, (1999)

External links

Palmerston Forts
Forts in Medway